Barzee is a surname of Dutch origin. Notable people with the surname include:

Anastasia Barzee (born 1960), American actress
Mary Flores (née Barzee, born 1962), American attorney and politician
Wanda Elaine Barzee, American kidnapper

References

Surnames of Dutch origin